The King of Elfland's Daughter is a 1924 fantasy novel  by Anglo-Irish writer Lord Dunsany. It is widely recognized as one of the most influential and acclaimed works in all of fantasy literature. Although the novel faded into relative obscurity following its initial release, it found new longevity and wider critical acclaim when a paperback edition was released in 1969 as the second volume of the Ballantine Adult Fantasy series. 

It has also been included in a more recent series of books reprinting the best of modern fantasy, the Fantasy Masterworks series. While seen as highly influential upon the genre as a whole, the novel was particularly formative in the (later-named) subgenres of fairytale fantasy and high fantasy.

Plot summary

The lord of Erl is told by the parliament of his people that they want to be ruled by a magic lord.  Obeying the immemorial custom, the lord sends his son Alveric to fetch the King of Elfland's daughter, Lirazel, to be his bride.  He makes his way to Elfland, where time passes at a rate far slower than the real world, and wins her.  They return to Erl and have a son, but in the manner of fairy brides of folklore, she fits uneasily with his people.  She returns to the waiting arms of her father in Elfland, and her lovesick husband goes searching for her, abandoning the kingdom of Erl and wandering in a now-hopeless quest.  However, Lirazel becomes lonesome for her mortal husband and son.  Seeing that she is unhappy, the King of Elfland uses a powerful magic to engulf the land of Erl.  Erl is transformed into a part of Elfland, and Lirazel and her loved ones are reunited forever in an eternal, enchanted world.

During the course of the novel, the King of Elfland uses up all of the three powerful magic spells he had been reserving for the defense of his realm.

Critical reception
Although the novel fell into obscurity after its initial release, it found a new readership when Ballantine Books re-issued it as part of their Adult Fantasy series in June 1969. The novel has since become widely recognized as one of the most influential and most praised of the genre. Many critics, including L. Sprague de Camp, described it as being on par with The Lord of the Rings in terms of its quality and influence. Arthur C. Clarke felt that the novel helped cement Dunsany as "one of the greatest writers of this century". 

The novel's reputation has continued to grow in the ensuing decades. In his review of the 1999 edition for The Magazine of Fantasy & Science Fiction, Charles de Lint praised the novel as superlative. "It's not simply the beauty of the language, the astute eye for character, the hint of humor, or even the spell of legendry and wonder, but Dunsany's unique combination of all of the above. Even read today, with all the fantasy novels I've read, his work remains fresh and exuberant". Gahan Wilson also praised Elfland's Daughter lavishly, calling it "likely Dunsany's masterpiece" and concluding "that may well be the same as saying it could be the very best fairy story ever written".

However, some reviewers have been more modest in their praise. E. F. Bleiler noted that the novel included "many stylistic brilliances, but the story suffers from too many shifts of attention". Jo Walton commented that it "is probably best described as good but odd. [Dunsany] isn’t at his best writing characters, which gets peculiar at novel length. What he could do, what he did better than anyone, was to take poetic images and airy tissues of imagination and weight them down at the corners with perfect details to craft a net to catch dreams in. It’s not surprising he couldn’t make this work for whole novels, when as far as I know, nobody else has ever quite made it work in prose."

Adaptations
Two members of Steeleye Span (Bob Johnson and Pete Knight) wrote and produced a  concept album entitled The King of Elfland's Daughter, which was inspired by the book. The singing talents of Frankie Miller (as Alveric), Mary Hopkin (as Lirazel), P.P. Arnold (as the Witch), and Alexis Korner (as a troll) are featured on the album, and the voice of Christopher Lee as the narrator and the King of Elfland. The musicians included Nigel Pegrum, Herbie Flowers, Ray Cooper and Chris Spedding.

References

Sources

External links
 
 
 

British fantasy novels
Irish fantasy novels
1924 British novels
Novels by Edward Plunkett, 18th Baron of Dunsany
High fantasy novels
1924 fantasy novels
G. P. Putnam's Sons books